The Windsor Golf Classic was a tournament on the Symetra Tour, the LPGA's developmental tour. It was a part of the Symetra Tour's schedule between 2019 and 2020. It was held at Windsor Golf Club in Windsor, California.

In 2019, Ireland's Leona Maguire clinched her maiden professional win in a playoff with Pajaree Anannarukarn.

The tournament in 2020 was cancelled due to the COVID-19 pandemic.

Winners

References

External links

Former Symetra Tour events
Golf in California